Football Madness is a video game for the PlayStation. It was released on March 28th, 2003 by Phoenix Games and was developed by Italian studio Naps Team. The game was only released in Europe.

The game is played in a 5-a-side indoor soccer environment where one of 16 international teams can be selected to play in a single match, league or cup. There are no rules and no referee and various power-ups can be collected during the game.

2003 video games
Association football video games
Europe-exclusive video games
Multiplayer and single-player video games
NAPS team games
PlayStation (console) games
PlayStation (console)-only games
Video games developed in Italy